Rédics is a village in Zala County, Hungary.

References

 

Populated places in Zala County